Martin Bower (born 1952) is a model maker and designer of special effects miniatures for both film and television. His credits include the television series Space: 1999 (1975-8), Blake's 7 (1978–81) and The Tripods (1984–85), and the films Alien (1979), Flash Gordon (1980) and Outland (1981). He has a long-standing professional relationship with special effects director Brian Johnson.

Notable designs

Blake's 7
"The Liberator" models, and the teleport bracelets, as seen in multiple episodes of the series

Space:1999
Mark IX Hawk model as seen in the episode "War Games"
Ultra Probe model as seen in the episode "Dragon's Domain"
Laser Tank model as seen in the episode "The Infernal Machine"
Super Swift model as seen in the episodes "The Bringers of Wonder, Part One" and "The Bringers of Wonder, Part Two"
Voyager One model as seen in the episode "Voyager's Return"

The Tripods
Models of the eponymous tripods used throughout the two series

References

External links

Martin Bower's Model World – comprehensive website of Bower's work 

Martin Bower – A Rising Star in the World of Miniatures by David Hirsch
Interview with Martin Bower on The Sci Fi World
Martin Bower's Model World on Born For Geekdom

1952 births
Living people
Miniature model-makers